Golden Hour is the third studio album by Norwegian tropical house DJ and record producer Kygo. It was released on 29 May 2020 by Sony Music.

Background
In June 2018, Kygo announced a collaboration with American rock band Imagine Dragons titled "Born to Be Yours". The single was released on 11 June. It streamed 362 million times on Spotify and 120 million times on YouTube, as of 2 January 2020. On 21 September, Kygo debuted his upcoming single, "Happy Now", during his set at the iHeartRadio Music Festival held at the T-Mobile Arena. The single is a collaboration with Sandro Cavazza. On 24 October, Kygo posted a clip from the single's music video on his social media account. The single was released on 26 October. It streamed 109 million times on YouTube and 330 million times on Spotify, as of 2 January 2020 

In October 2018, Kygo and his manager, Myles Shear, partnered with Sony Music Entertainment and launched the Palm Tree Records label. Palm Tree Records aims to be a platform for up-and-coming artists.

"Think About You" featuring American singer Valerie Broussard. It was released as a single on 14 February 2019, and considered timed for Valentine's Day.

"Carry On" is a song with English singer Rita Ora, released as a standalone single for the 2019 film Detective Pikachu. The song was released on 19 April 2019 through RCA Records. It has streamed 174 million times on Spotify.

On 23 May 2019, Kygo released "Not OK" with American singer Chelsea Cutler. As of 2 January 2020 its YouTube video has 72 million views and on Spotify the song has been streamed over 69 million times.

On 14 June 2019, Kygo released his first Norwegian-language song, with Bergen rappers Store P and Lars Vaular called "Kem kan eg ringe".

On 28 June 2019, Kygo remixed Whitney Houston's cover version of Steve Winwood's song "Higher Love". On 21 August 2019, "Higher Love" reached No. 1 position on Billboard magazine's Dance Club Songs chart, making it Houston's highest-charting posthumous release to date. "Higher Love" has been streamed over 252 million times on Spotify as of 2 January 2020.

On 6 December 2019, Kygo collaborated with the Chainsmokers on a track, named "Family".

On 20 January Kygo, via his socials, teased an unreleased Avicii track known as "Forever Yours". This track was first played by Avicii at Ultra Music Festival 2016 but never completed during his lifetime, so Kygo gave his tropical touches to the song after Sandro Cavazza, his fellow collaborator, sent him the track, and with due consent from Avicii's family. The track was released on 24 January 2020.

On 23 March 2020, Kygo announced via his social media that he had completed his third album titled Golden Hour. He then released the single "Like It Is", with Zara Larsson and Tyga, on 27 March 2020.

On 2 April 2020, Kygo released "I'll Wait" with vocals by Sasha Sloan. The next day, a music video was released starring real-life American couple Rob Gronkowski and Camille Kostek containing personal footage of their life together. On 16 April 2020, Kygo collaborated with Moroccan-English singer Zak Abel on a track titled "Freedom".

On 11 May 2020, Kygo officially announced the track list for the Golden Hour album. On 15 May 2020, he released another track, with OneRepublic, titled "Lose Somebody", along with the pre-order for the album. Kygo released the sixth and final single from the album, "The Truth", featuring Valerie Broussard (with whom he previously collaborated on "Think About You"), on 22 May 2020.

Track listing

Notes
  signifies a co-producer
  signifies a vocal producer

Charts

Weekly charts

Year-end charts

Certifications

References

2020 albums
Kygo albums
Sony Music albums